Joshua Rosenthal is the founder and director of the Institute for Integrative Nutrition, a holistic nutrition school based in New York City.

Education
Rosenthal has a Master's of Science degree in education, specializing in counseling, from Duquesne University.

Integrative Nutrition
In 1992, Rosenthal founded the Institute for Integrative Nutrition (IIN), a program that offers a health coach training program. It began as a cooking class in a rented kitchen in NYC and has grown into the world's largest nutrition school. The school has more than 100,000 students in 123 countries and growing and students learn topics that range from holistic nutrition and coaching to business and marketing

Rosenthal is currently the director and primary instructor for the Institute for Integrative Nutrition, teaching alongside other nutrition and wellness experts, including Andrew Weil, Deepak Chopra and Barry Sears, among others. Rosenthal has more than 30 years of experience in curriculum development, personal coaching, and nutritional counseling. He speaks every year at IIN's annual conference at Lincoln Center in New York City.

Rosenthal coined the term primary food, which refers to anything that provides nourishment to a person's body. This includes relationships, career, physical activity, and spirituality. Secondary food is the food people eat. He also developed the term bio-individuality, which means a diet that works well for one person will not always benefit another. These theories, along with Rosenthal's concept creation of a health coach, are the result of his time studying macrobiotics at the Kushi Institute and searching for more knowledge of food and health.

In 2006, Rosenthal lobbied the city of New York to be the first major U.S. city to ban trans fats.

In 2016, he worked closely with elected officials in Washington D.C. to declare a National Health Coach Week in January to generate awareness for health and wellness.

The Institute for Integrative Nutrition has received extensive criticism from Quackwatch on a variety of issues.

Publications
Rosenthal authored books that include,  Integrative Nutrition: Feed Your Hunger for Health and Happiness,” Integrative Nutrition: The Future of Nutrition, The Integrative Nutrition Cookbook: Simple recipes for health and happiness, and The Power of Primary Food: Nourishment Beyond The Plate.

References

Year of birth missing (living people)
Living people
Businesspeople from New York City
Duquesne University alumni